Panorama is a suburb in the Thessaloniki regional unit, Greece. Since the 2011 local government reform it is part of the municipality Pylaia-Chortiatis, of which it is the seat and a municipal unit. Panorama has a population of 18,000 and is located at the foot of Mount Chortiatis. The municipal unit has an area of 21.321 km2.

Historical population

References

See also
List of settlements in the Thessaloniki regional unit

Populated places in Thessaloniki (regional unit)